Michael Raelert (born 29 August 1980) is a German triathlete who is the 2009 and 2010 Ironman 70.3 World Champion. In 2010, Raelert won Ironman 70.3 races at Switzerland, California, and Germany, as well as the 28th Avia Wildflower Triathlon.

Raelert's older brother, Andreas Raelert, is also an active triathlete.

References

External links 
 Michael and Andreas Raelert website 

1980 births
German male triathletes
Living people
People from Bezirk Rostock
Sportspeople from Rostock